Vu D'un Chien is a studio album by the French progressive rock band Ange. It was released in 1980.

Track listing
Side One:
"Les Temps Modernes"  – 05:12
"Les Lorgnons"  – 03:58
"Foutez-Moi La Paix"  – 02:10
"Je Travaille Sans Filet"  – 07:10
Side Two:
"La Suisse"  – 05:40
"Personne Au Bout Du Fil"  – 03:49
"Pour Un Rien"  – 02:48
"Vu D'un Chien"  – 06:13

Personnel
Lead Vocals, Acoustic Guitar, Keyboards: Christian Decamps
Keyboards, Backing Vocals: Francis Decamps
Guitar: Robert Defer
Bass, Backing Vocals: Didier Viseux
Drums, Percussion: Jean-Pierre Guichard

References
Vu D'un Chien on ange-updlm 
Vu D'un Chien on www.discogs.com

Ange albums
1980 albums